Michael Taft Benson (born February 28, 1965) is an American academic administrator serving as the president and professor of history at Coastal Carolina University. He previously served as president of Eastern Kentucky University, Southern Utah University, and Snow College, and as special assistant to the president at University of Utah. He was appointed Visiting Professor within the Department of the History of Science and Technology at Johns Hopkins University in January 2020.

Early life and education

Benson earned his bachelor's degree, cum laude, from Brigham Young University, where he was elected to Phi Kappa Phi. He then went on to earn a doctorate in modern history from St Antony's College, Oxford, where he was a Rotary Foundation Ambassadorial Scholar. His dissertation committee included Daniel Walker Howe, Robert Dallek, and John Lewis Gaddis. While at Oxford, Benson served as an officer in the Oxford University L'Chaim Society, led by founder Rabbi Shmuley Boteach.

Benson also earned a master's degree cum laude in non-profit administration in 2011 from the Mendoza College of Business at the University of Notre Dame, and a master’s in liberal arts in 2021 from Johns Hopkins University where he was elected to the Association of Graduate Liberal Studies Programs (AGLSP) National Honor
Society. Two years after completing his degree from Notre Dame, the
Mendoza College of Business recognized Benson with its Recent Alumni Service Award. In recent years, he has received national attention for his religious ecumenicism and his humorous use of social media to reach students.

Benson played JV basketball at Brigham Young University, and was a member of the Oxford University Men's Basketball Team that won the 1993–94 British University Sports Federation (BUSF) National Championship and placed second at the British University Sports Association (BUSA) National Tournament. He is also a golfer and marathon runner, having won his age division in the 1983 St. George Marathon (personal best of 2:41) and placing among the top 15% of all runners in the 1984 Boston Marathon. He was inducted into the Southern Utah University Circle of Omicron Delta Kappa in 2012.

Career

Snow College
In 2001, Benson was appointed as the 14th president of Snow College. At the age of 36, he was the youngest college or university president in the history of the Utah System of Higher Education. During his tenure, Benson raised the private funds to construct the Eccles Center for the Performing Arts, made Snow an All-Steinway school, and brought Elie Wiesel to campus for a lecture and to receive an honorary degree. Benson was inducted into the Horne School of Music Hall of Fame at
Snow College in December 2022.

Southern Utah University
Benson was appointed the president of Southern Utah University on November 10, 2006, by the Utah State Board of Regents. Two weeks into his presidency, Benson secured the largest donation in the school's history, which was used to expand SUU's Science Complex. He was also instrumental in gaining admission for SUU into the Big Sky Conference  and landed the largest gift in the university's history from the Sorenson Legacy Foundation to help construct the Beverly Taylor Sorenson Center for the Arts. In March 2014, Benson returned to Cedar City to help celebrate the conclusion of "The Future is Rising" campaign which brought in a record $105 million in seven years for Southern Utah University.

Eastern Kentucky University

On August 1, 2013, Benson became the 12th president of Eastern Kentucky University.

In 2015, Benson worked with retired EKU Archivist Charles Hay and senior Damir Siahkoohi and proposed to the EKU Board of Regents that Dr. Mary Roark, Eastern's “acting” president in 1909–10, be named officially as Eastern's second president. The Board took this action at its February 2, 2015, meeting. Dr. Mary Roark assumed the presidency when her husband Ruric Nevel Roark died suddenly after a short illness, and was the first female to serve as president of any public college or university in the state of Kentucky. Benson thus became Eastern's 13th president.

During his six-and-a-half-year tenure at EKU, Benson oversaw nearly $300 million in capital improvements to the campus that included the largest state appropriation in the University’s history ($66.5 million) for phase II of a Science complex. He also launched the most aggressive fund raising campaign ever: Make No Little Plans. Retention and graduation rates also increased as did annual fund raising totals.

On December 11, 2019 President Benson announced his resignation from Eastern Kentucky University effective January 6, 2020. He was subsequently named President Emeritus of EKU and spent 2020 researching and writing his latest book on Daniel Coit Gilman for Johns Hopkins University Press.

Coastal Carolina University
In October 2020, Coastal Carolina University announced the appointment of Michael T. Benson as its next president. Benson began his tenure on Jan. 1, 2021. He replaced David A. DeCenzo, who retired after serving for nearly 14 years as the University's president. Benson's first 100 days in office were chronicled in a series of campus-produced videos by the CCU communications team.

In August 2021, CCU welcomed its largest and best-prepared freshman class in history. The University also landed at spot #5 in Best Value School for the Southern region in the latest U.S. News & World Report rankings. In September 2021, former head football coach and CEO of TD Ameritrade, Joe Moglia, made a substantial gift to Coastal Carolina University to complete funding for a new soccer facility as well as a multi-purpose building that will constructed in the south endzone of Brooks Stadium. In May 2022, Coastal Carolina announced the largest gift in its history: $10 million from Conway Medical Center to name and endow a new College of Health and Human Performance. Funds from the gift will provide scholarships for students and also help construct an indoor practice facility on the south side of Brooks Stadium.
In August 2022, the Coastal Carolina University Board of Trustees unanimously voted to extend
Benson’s contract as president through 2028.

Other appointments

Benson served as Chair of the NCAA Honors Committee and Chair of the Presidents' Council for the Ohio Valley Conference and on the NCAA Division I Presidential Forum. In October 2021, Benson was appointed to the NCAA Board of Governors Committee to Promote Cultural Diversity and Equity as the FBS presidential representative. He is also a former chair of the Higher Education Consortium for Bluegrass Tomorrow and a member of the Steering Committee of Kentucky Rising. He currently serves on the
Executive Committee of the Northeastern Strategic Alliance (NESA) based in Florence, South Carolina; on the Advocacy Council of the Myrtle Beach Area Chamber of Commerce; on the Executive Committee of the Myrtle Beach Regional Economic Development Corporation; and on the Myrtle Beach Chamber of Commerce Board of Directors. In May 2021, Benson was elected to the Board of Trustees for the Omicron Delta Kappa Society (ODK) and Educational Foundation, Inc.

Benson was a member of the Council of Presidents for the Association of Governing Boards of Universities and Colleges (AGB) and the Task Force for University Partnerships for the American Association of State Colleges and Universities (AASCU). Benson also served as the convener for all presidents of public universities in Kentucky for two years.

In 2009, Governor Jon M. Huntsman named Benson to a four-year term as member of the seven-person Utah Appellate Courts Nominating Commission. Benson served as Chair of the Presidents’ Council for the Summit League, SUU's Division I athletic conference. Benson also served on the Advisory Board of the Cedar City Airport. Benson has completed a two-year term as the Chair of the Executive Committee of the Utah State Campus Compact. He is a past member of the Zions Bank Central Utah Board of Advisors, and the Wells Fargo Southwest Utah Board of Advisors. He has been employed in many other capacities, including: Associate Director of Major Gifts (University of Utah), Consulting Historian (Harry S. Truman Library), Academic Advisor and Essayist (Skirball Cultural Center), Visiting Lecturer (Brigham Young University, University of Utah), Professor (adjunct) at the Mendoza College of Business at the University of Notre Dame, and Research Assistant (U.S. Senate Labor Committee).

Publications

Benson is the author of Harry S. Truman and the Founding of Israel and, with co-author Hal Boyd, published College for the Commonwealth: A Case for Higher Education in American Democracy with the University Press of Kentucky (2018). The volume expands the arguments of Benson and Boyd's article, "The Public University: The Democratic Purpose of Higher Education." Their work was nominated for the University of Louisville 2020 Grawemeyer Award in Education.

Benson's third book was released in 2022 by Johns Hopkins University Press. Titled Daniel Coit Gilman and the Birth of the American Research University, this work recounts the life of Johns Hopkins University's first president, Daniel Coit Gilman, and the establishment of America's first research university in Baltimore in 1876. Benson delivered the keynote address at the annual Johns Hopkins Master of Liberal Arts Colloquium in May 2021, focusing on his Gilman research and writing.

Benson is regularly sought after for public speeches and appearances. He was a featured contributor to the Huffington Post for five years; has written articles for the Jerusalem Post, Lexington Herald-Leader, the Louisville Courier Journal, the Kansas City Star, the Deseret News, and the Salt Lake Tribune, among others; and appeared on ESPN's Paul Finebaum Show.

Personal life

Benson and his first wife, Celia Barnes, divorced in 2004. They are the parents of two children, Emma and Samuel.
 
Benson and his wife, Debi, are the parents of three children: Truman, Tatum and Talmage.

Benson is a grandson of former U.S. Secretary of Agriculture and LDS Church President Ezra Taft Benson, and served an LDS mission in Rome, Italy. His older brother Steve Benson is a Pulitzer Prize winning editorial cartoonist.

References

External links

Coastal Carolina University Profile 
SUU biography of Michael Benson  
Southern Utah University Office of the President 
Southern Utah University - The Inauguration of Michael T. Benson

1965 births
American Mormon missionaries in Italy
Alumni of St Antony's College, Oxford
University of Utah staff
Brigham Young University alumni
Coastal Carolina University people
Mendoza College of Business alumni
Living people
Snow College
Southern Utah University faculty
20th-century Mormon missionaries
Benson family
Presidents of Eastern Kentucky University
Johns Hopkins University faculty